Biot or BIOT may refer to:

Places
Biot (crater), a lunar crater, named after Jean-Baptiste Biot
 Biot, Alpes-Maritimes, a commune in Provence-Alpes-Côte d'Azur, France
 Biot, a village in Castelnau-de-Brassac, Midi-Pyrénées, France
 Le Biot, Haute-Savoie, France
 Cape Biot, Greenland
 British Indian Ocean Territory (BIOT), or British Chagos Islands (BCI), an overseas island territory of the United Kingdom situated in the Indian Ocean

People
 Biot (surname)

Fiction
 Biot ("BIological robOT"), the  name given to an extraterrestrial biological robot in the fictional universe of Arthur C. Clarke's  novel Rendezvous with Rama (1973).
 Biot, a fictional world in the DC Comics universe; see Manhunters
 Biological robot
 Biot, Biological Optical Transputer Systems, robots in the Phantom 2040 animated series

Science
 Biot number, a dimensionless number used in heat transfer calculations, named after Jean-Baptiste Biot
 Biot (unit), a unit of current, named after Jean-Baptiste Biot
 Biot's breathing, an abnormal pattern of breathing characterized by groups of quick, shallow inspirations followed by regular or irregular periods of apnea; named by Camille Biot

Other uses
 Biot glider company, see List of gliders (B)

See also

 Canton of Antibes-Biot, France